Persbo is an impact crater in the Elysium quadrangle of Mars. It measures 19.5 kilometer in diameter and was named after Persbo, Sweden. It is just south of the Cerberus Fossae, and is adjacent to the Athabasca Valles, which issue from one of the fossae.
Impact craters generally have a rim with ejecta around them, in contrast volcanic craters usually do not have a rim or ejecta deposits. As craters get larger (greater than 10 km in diameter) they usually have a central peak. The peak is caused by a rebound of the crater floor following the impact.

See also

References 

Impact craters on Mars
Elysium quadrangle